Sesayap Tidong or Northern Tidung is one of several Sabahan languages of Sabah, Malaysia, spoken by the Tidong people. It retains the system of Austronesian alignment that has been lost by Southern Tidung in Kalimantan, Indonesia.

References

Murutic languages
Languages of Sabah